Miguel Fallardo  (born 24 June 1986, Portugal) is a Portuguese footballer.

External links
Profile at football-lineups.com

1987 births
Living people
Portuguese footballers
Association football midfielders
Liga I players
FC Gloria Buzău players
Expatriate footballers in Romania
Portuguese expatriate sportspeople in Romania